Dead Relatives is the fifth full-length album by Canadian singer-songwriter Emm Gryner, released in 2000 on her independent label Dead Daisy Records.

Track listing
 "Parting Song" (4:05)
 "Mary Jill" (5:39)
 "Summerlong" (3:33)
 "Half Sorry" (3:47)
 "A Little War" (5:03)
 "Yellow" (5:54)
 "Daryn Song" (3:24)
 "Suffer" (3:52)
 "Lonely Boy" (2:33)
 "Atlas" (3:43)
 "Joan" (4:33)

2000 albums
Emm Gryner albums